The Seward Mansion is a historic house at 30 Flanders Road, in Turkey Brook Park, Mount Olive Township, Morris County, New Jersey. The mansion, described using its historic name, Seward House, was added to the National Register of Historic Places on December 24, 2013 for its significance in architecture. The farmhouse, built , was the home of Henry Clay Seward (born 1829), son of Henry Seward (born 1795).

Gallery

See also
National Register of Historic Places listings in Morris County, New Jersey

References

Mount Olive Township, New Jersey	
Houses in Morris County, New Jersey
National Register of Historic Places in Morris County, New Jersey
New Jersey Register of Historic Places
Italianate architecture in New Jersey
1865 establishments in New Jersey